Italyanskaya Street is a street in Saint Petersburg, Russia, which goes from the Griboyedov Canal to the Fontanka Embankment. It intersects with the Arts and Manezhnaya squares, as well as the Mikhailovskaya, Sadovaya, Malaya Sadovaya and Karavannaya streets.

The street was named after the Italian Palace, which had been built there in 1739 and demolished in the early 19th century. The Ekaterininskiy Institute was built in its place.

Between 1871 and 1902, the street was called Bolshaya Italyanskaya ('Big Italian'), while the modern Zhukovskogo Street was called Malaya Italyanskaya ('Small Italian').

Notable buildings
Many buildings on this street are listed as cultural heritage objects:
№ 1 — House of Jesuits
№ 2/6 — Branobel house
№ 3 — Catholic Church of Saint Catherine
№ 7/1 — Grand Hotel Europe
№ 9/2 — Saint Petersburg Philharmonia
№ 23/12 — 
№ 25 — Shuvalov Mansion
№ 27 — 
№ 39/21 — Naryshkin-Shuvalov Palace

References

Literature

Streets in Saint Petersburg